Tricholita notata, the marked noctuid, is a species of cutworm or dart moth in the family Noctuidae. It is found in North America.

The MONA or Hodges number for Tricholita notata is 10628.

Subspecies
These two subspecies belong to the species Tricholita notata:
 Tricholita notata chicagoensis Wyatt, 1938
 Tricholita notata notata

References

Further reading

 
 
 

Eriopygini
Articles created by Qbugbot
Moths described in 1898